Point Batee, historically known as Point Baka, Point Pedro or Pedropunt, is a beach and cape located in Mesjid Raya Subdistrict, Aceh Besar Regency, Aceh, Indonesia. This beach is located approximately 20 kilometers northeast of Banda Aceh. This beach is the northernmost point of Sumatra.

References 

Batee
Landforms of Aceh